Cheng Yu (born  1952) is a Chinese retired para table tennis player. She won a gold and a bronze medal at the 1988 Summer Paralympics. She was once trained by Feng Mengya.

She sustained injuries to both feet in a traffic accident when she was 15. As hospitals were in limbo during the Cultural Revolution, her treatment was delayed, which caused her left foot to be amputated eight years later. She has worked as a physician since her retirement.

References

1952 births
Chinese female table tennis players
Table tennis players at the 1988 Summer Paralympics
Paralympic table tennis players of China
Medalists at the 1988 Summer Paralympics
Paralympic medalists in table tennis
Paralympic gold medalists for China
Paralympic bronze medalists for China
Table tennis players from Wuhan
Living people
Chinese amputees
FESPIC Games competitors